The Estádio da Luz, officially named Estádio do Sport Lisboa e Benfica, is a multi-purpose stadium located in Lisbon, Portugal. It is used mostly for association football matches, hosting the home games of Portuguese club S.L. Benfica, its owner.

Opened on 25 October 2003 with an exhibition match between Benfica and Uruguayan club Nacional, it replaced the original Estádio da Luz, which had 120,000 seats. The seating capacity was decreased to 65,647 and is currently set at 64,642. The stadium was designed by HOK Sport Venue Event and had a construction cost of €162 million.

A UEFA category four stadium and one of the biggest stadiums by capacity in Europe (the biggest in Portugal), Estádio da Luz hosted several matches of the UEFA Euro 2004, including its final, as well as the 2014 and 2020 finals of the UEFA Champions League. It was elected the most beautiful stadium of Europe in a 2014 online poll by L'Équipe. By its fifteenth birthday, Estádio do Sport Lisboa e Benfica Luz had welcomed more than 17 million spectators.

Naming
While the previous Benfica stadium was also officially named "Estádio do Sport Lisboa e Benfica", both the old and the new stadia are invariably referred to by their unofficial name, Estádio da Luz. Luz is the name of the neighborhood the stadium was built on, on the border between the parishes of Benfica and Carnide, which itself derives its name from the nearby Igreja de Nossa Senhora da Luz (Church of Our Lady of Light). This unofficial name caught on soon after the original stadium's construction; the people of Lisbon used to simply call it a Luz ("the Light"). Therefore, the stadium's common name became "Estádio da Luz", which is usually anglicised to "Stadium of Light". This translation, however, could be argued to be inaccurate, since Luz refers not to "light" but to the original address of the stadium: Estrada da Luz ("Road of Light").

Characteristics
Architect Damon Lavelle, from HOK Sport Venue Event (now Populous), designed the stadium to focus on light and transparency. Its polycarbonate roof allows the sunlight to penetrate the stadium in order to illuminate it. The roof, which is supported by tie-beams of four steel arches, seems to float on the underlying tribunes. The arches are 43 metres (141 feet) high and help define the look of the stadium, after having been shaped to be similar to the wavy profile of its three tiers.

Notable matches

Opening game

In the opening match, Benfica beat Uruguayan side Nacional 2–1 with goals from Nuno Gomes, who became the first ever scorer at the Estádio da Luz.

UEFA Euro 2004 Final

2014 UEFA Champions League Final

Highest attendance official match

On round 33 of the 2016–17 Primeira Liga, in a match where Benfica were crowned national champions for a fourth consecutive season (a new achievement for them), Estádio da Luz recorded its best attendance in official matches.

2019–20 UEFA Champions League
Quarter-finals

Final

Portugal national football team matches

The following national team matches were held in the stadium.

Euro 2004 matches

Benfica matches in UEFA competitions

2003–04 UEFA Cup
3–1 Molde
1–0 Rosenborg
0–0 Inter Milan
2004–05
1–0 Anderlecht (UEFA Champions League)
2–0 Dukla Banská Bystrica (UEFA Cup)
4–2 Heerenveen
2–0 Dinamo Zagreb
1–1 CSKA Moscow
2005–06 UEFA Champions League
1–0 Lille
0–1 Villarreal
2–1 Manchester United
1–0 Liverpool
0–0 Barcelona
2006–07
3–0 Austria Wien (UEFA Champions League)
0–1 Manchester United
3–0 Celtic
3–1 Copenhagen
1–0 Dinamo București (UEFA Cup)
3–1 Paris Saint-Germain
0–0 Espanyol
2007–08
2–1 Copenhagen (UEFA Champions League)
0–1 Shakhtar Donetsk
1–0 Celtic
1–1 Milan
1–0 Nürnberg (UEFA Cup)
1–2 Getafe
2008–09 UEFA Cup
2–0 Napoli
0–2 Galatasaray
0–1 Metalist Kharkiv
2009–10 UEFA Europa League
4–0 Vorskla
2–0 BATE Borisov
5–0 Everton
2–1 AEK Athens
4–0 Hertha Berlin
1–1 Marseille
2–1 Liverpool
2010–11
2–0 Hapoel (UEFA Champions League)
4–3 Lyon
1–2 Schalke 04
2–1 Stuttgart (UEFA Europa League)
2–1 Paris Saint-Germain
4–1 PSV Eindhoven
2–1 Braga
2011–12 UEFA Champions League
2–0 Trabzonspor
3–1 Twente
1–1 Manchester United
1–1 Basel
1–0 Oțelul Galați
2–0 Zenit
0–1 Chelsea
2012–13
0–2 Barcelona (UEFA Champions League)
2–0 Spartak Moscow
2–1 Celtic
2–1 Bayer Leverkusen (UEFA Europa League)
1–0 Bordeaux
3–1 Newcastle United
3–1 Fenerbahçe
2013–14
2–0 Anderlecht (UEFA Champions League)
1–1 Olympiakos
2–1 Paris Saint-Germain
3–0 PAOK (UEFA Europa League)
2–2 Tottenham
2–0 AZ Alkmaar
2–1 Juventus
2014–15 UEFA Champions League
0–2 Zenit
1–0 Monaco
0–0 Bayer Leverkusen
2015–16 UEFA Champions League
2–0 Astana
2–1 Galatasaray
1–2 Atlético Madrid
1–0 Zenit
2–2 Bayern Munich
2016–17 UEFA Champions League
1–1 Beşiktaş
1–0 Dynamo Kyiv
1–2 Napoli
1–0 Borussia Dortmund
2017–18 UEFA Champions League
1–2 CSKA Moscow
0–1 Manchester United
0–2 Basel
2018–19
1–0 Fenerbahçe (UEFA Champions League)
1–1 PAOK
0–2 Bayern Munich
1–1 Ajax
1–0 AEK Athens
0–0 Galatasaray (UEFA Europa League)
3–0 Dinamo Zagreb
4–2 Eintracht Frankfurt
2019–20
1–2 RB Leipzig (UEFA Champions League)
2–1 Lyon
3–0 Zenit
3–3 Shakhtar Donetsk (UEFA Europa League)
2020–21 UEFA Europa League
3–0 Standard Liège
3–3 Rangers
4–0 Lech Poznań
2021–22 UEFA Champions League
2–0 Spartak Moscow
2–1 PSV Eindhoven
3–0 Barcelona
0–4 Bayern Munich
2–0 Dynamo Kyiv
2–2 Ajax
1–3 Liverpool
2022–23 UEFA Champions League
4–1 Midtjylland
3–0 Dynamo Kyiv
1–0 Maccabi Haifa
1–1 Paris Saint-Germain
4–3 Juventus
5–1 Club Brugge
All-time statistics
107 matches: 68 wins, 20 draws, 19 losses
187 goals scored, 90 goals conceded

See also
 List of football stadiums in Portugal

Notes

References

External links

 
 

Estadio da Luz
Sports venues in Lisbon
Football venues in Portugal
Sport in Lisbon
Sports venues completed in 2003
UEFA Euro 2004 stadiums
UEFA European Championship final stadiums
2003 establishments in Portugal